Yi Sanhae (20 July 1539 – 1609) was a Korean politician, scholar, writer and poet of the Joseon period who came from the Hansan Yi clan. He served as the Chief State Councilor of Joseon from 1590 to 1592 and 1600. Yi was a member of the political faction the Easterners and when this split into the Northerners and Southerners, Yi became leader of the Northerners faction.

Early life 
Yi was born in Hanseong to a yangban family and his 5th great-grandfather was Yi Saek, a scholar and writer that lived during late Goryeo. He studied under his uncle Yi Ji-ham and was praised for his intelligence. At age 5 he is said to have written poems and by age 15 he had passed the Hyangsi Examination multiple times and was famous for his calligraphy and painting skills. He also studied under Jo Sik and Yi Hwang and would later go on to form the Eastern and Northern factions with his classmates.

He passed the Mungwa in 1561 and was initially appointed to the Seungmuwon, the department in charge of Joseon's diplomatic relations.

Career 
In 1562, he was recommended to the Hongmungwan. He would then go on to hold various ranks until becoming Jikjehak in 1567. In 1570, he became one of the six royal secretaries, part of the Sueunjungwon. He resigned from his post in 1574 after his father's death but returned 3 years later and was appointed to Daesagan.

In 1578, he was put in charge of a corruption investigation involving Yun Doo Su and Yun Geun Su, leaders of the Westerners faction. Yi, who was part of the Easterners, viciously attacked the brothers and had them removed from their positions. Later that year when he was appointed Daejehak and Doseungji, the Westerners, holding a grudge for his previous actions, opposed this. However, the king Seonjo trusted in Yi's talents and ignored the complaints.

In 1579, he was promoted to Minister of Law. In 1583, he went through the posts of Chief of the Uigeumbu, Minister of Personnel, Rites and Military Affairs in a single year. Attacks against Yi from the Westerners intensified in 1585 and Kim Yu Yung and Yi San Bo reported this to Seonjo. The king assured the two, saying his trust in Yi would not be shaken by false rumours. In 1585, Yi tried to resign from his post after the mass death of the horses meant to be sent as tribute but the King refused to accept his resignation. He attempted to resign again in 1586 after being attacked by the Westerner Jo Heon, but Seonjo once again persuaded him to stay.

In 1588, Yi was appointed as the Right State Councilor (Uuijeong) despite resistance from the Westerners and he was promoted to the Left State Councilor (Jwauijeong) a year later in 1589.

Also in 1589, Jeong Yeo Rip, a former Westerner who had switched factions to the more dominant Easterners, was accused of treason. Seonjo made the Westerner Jeong Chol the Right State Councilor and put him in charge of the investigation. The Westerners took this opportunity to launch a purge and killed many prominent Easterners including, Jeon Yon Sin, Jeong Gae Chung, Yi Bal and more. There were attempts to implicate Yi in the rebellion as well but failed due to Seonjo's deep trust in him. When Jeong Am Su and 50 others requested that Yi San Hae and Ryu Seong Ryong be punished for connections to Jeong Yeo Rip, Seonjo became angered and instead ordered for the punishment of those who had made the request. He then personally met Yi and Ryu and reassured them.

In 1590, he promoted to the Chief State Councilor (Yeonguijeong), the highest position in court.

When it became time to appoint an heir to the king, Yi decided to take the opportunity to regain dominance for the Easterners and take revenge for the purge of 1589. The consensus in court was that Prince Gwanghae would be best suited to become the Seja (Crown Prince), but Yi knew that Seonjo preferred Prince Sinseong. In 1591, when Jeong Chol, Ryu Seong Ryong, Yi Hae Su, Yi Seong Jung and others came to Yi discuss the matter of succession, he pretended to agree with the others and agreed to recommend Prince Gwanghae be made Seja to the King. Yi San Hae was very close with the Kim Gong Ryang, brother of Lady In, Prince Sinseongs mother and Concubine of Seonjo and informed him that Jeong Chol and the Westerners were trying harm the Lady and Prince Sinseong. Kim then informed his sister who went to the King weeping with the news. Then Yi led all of the ministers to Seonjo and asked him to name a successor. When the King asked the ministers who should become the Seja, Jeong Cheol and the Westerners recommended Prince Gwanghae while the Easterners Yi San Hae and Ryu Seong Ryong remained silent. This greatly angered Seonjo, who immediately dismissed Jeong Chol and the others who had agreed with him from their positions.

A fracture emerged within the Easterners faction on how to deal with Jeong Cheol. The Northerners such as Jeon In Hong who were mostly students of Jo Sik who were the more aggressive wing of the Easterners had suffered greatly in Jeong Yeo Rib's Purge pushed for Jeong's execution and stronger persecution against the Westerners. Meanwhile, the more conservative Easterners led by Ryu Seong Ryong were mostly students of Yi Hwang and suffered less during the purge so just wanted to settle for exile. Yi San Hae was part of the Northerners and fearing that one day Jeong Chol would seek revenge, argued strongly for his execution.

The Northerners won the struggle and became the dominant faction just before the outbreak of the Imjin War in 1592. After the fall of the Westerners, Yi had them all dismissed from court and replaced them by recalling the Easterners who had been removed during the purge.

Imjin War 
Yi San Hae was the Chief State Councilor when the Japanese invaded in 1592, beginning the Imjin War. After the defeats at Sangju and Tangeumdae, Seonjo expressed his wish to abandon the capital of Hanseong. This was opposed by all the government ministers except for Yi, who argued that there was a precedent in history for similar events. Blamed for the initial military setbacks and the loss of the capital, Yi was exiled to Kangwon Province until 1595. He was released in 1595 and returned to court despite opposition from the Westerners. During the war, to oppose Ryu Seong Ryong who supported Yi Sun Shin, Yi San Hae was more sympathetic towards Won Gyun. After his return he became Daejehak and acted as the leader of the Northerners although by this time they had divided into the greater Northerner and Smaller Northerners. Yi San Hae was part of the Greater Northerners but largely stayed out of inter factional squabbles.

In 1596, he was put in charge of investigating a peasant rebellion led by Yi Mong Hak.

After the death of Toyotomi Hideyoshi, the Japanese began withdrawing from Korea in 1598. Yi San Hae's son Yi Gyeong Jeon had also passed the Gwageo examination and had been recommended for the post of Ijo Jeongrang, however the previous Ijo Jeongrang Jung Gyung Sae who was a Southerner opposed the appointment based on Yi's personality. This greatly angered Yi San Hae and his followers and deepened his distrust in the Southerners.

Later life and death 
In 1601, he received the noble title of Aseong Buwongun, and served in various roles until 1609. Late into Seonjo's reign, when the Northerners split over the succession, with the Greater Northerners supporting Prince Gwanghae for the throne and the Smaller Northerners supporting Prince Yeongchang, Yi supported Prince Gwanghae although he knew the king preferred Prince Yeongchang as he thought the latter was too young (3 years old). After Seonjo's death in 1608, Yi prevented a plot by the Smaller Northerners and ensured Prince Gwanghae succeeded to the throne. He retired in 1609 and died later that year.

Family
Though Yi's great-great-grandfather, Yi U (이우)'s cousin, Yi Gae (이개, 李塏) become Yi San-hae's third cousin.

 Great-Great-Great-Great-Great-Great-Grandfather
 Yi Gok (이곡, 李穀) (25 August 1298 - 28 January 1351)
 Great-Great-Great-Great-Great-Great-Grandmother
 Lady Kim of the Hamchang Kim clan (함창 김씨, 咸昌金氏)
 Great-Great-Great-Great-Great-Grandfather
 Yi Saek (이색, 李穡) (17 June 1328 – 17 June 1396)
 Great-Great-Great-Great-Great-Grandmother
 Lady Gwon of the Andong Gwon clan (안동 권씨, 安東 權氏)
 Great-Great-Great-Great-Grandfather
 Yi Jung-seon (이종선, 李種善)
 Great-Great-Great-Great-Grandmother
 Lady Gwon of the Andong Gwon clan (안동 권씨, 安東 權氏)
 Great-Great-Great-Grandfather
 Yi Gye-jeon (이계전, 李季甸) (1404 - 16 September 1459)
 Great-Great-Great-Grandmother
 Lady Jin (진씨)
 Great-Great-Grandfather
 Yi U (이우, 李堣) (1432 - ?)
Great-grandfather
 Yi Jang-yun (이장윤, 李長潤)
Grandfather
 Yi Chi (이치, 李穉) (1477 - 1530)
Grandmother
 Lady Kim of the Gwangju Kim clan (광주 김씨, 夫人 光州 金氏) 
Father
 Yi Ji-beon (이지번, 李之蕃; 1508 - 1 December/21 April 1575)
 Uncle: Yi Ji-yeong (이지영, 李之英)
 Uncle: Yi Ji-mu (이지무,李之茂)
Uncle: Yi Ji-ham (이지함, 李之菡) (5 October 1510 – 19 August 1578)
Mother:
Biological: Lady Nam of the Uiryeong Nam clan (의령 남씨, 夫人 宜寧 南氏) (1509 – 24 June 1581)
Grandfather: Nam Su (남수, 南修)
Stepmother: Lady Ji of the Chungju Ji clan (충주 지씨, 夫人 忠州 池氏)
 Siblings
Older sister: Lady Yi (이씨, 夫人 李氏)
Brother-in-law: Hwang Jeong-su (황정수, 黃廷秀)
 Older sister: Lady Yi (이씨, 夫人 李氏)
Brother-in-law: Kim Eung-nam (김응남, 金應男) of the Wonju Kim clan
 Younger half-brother: Yi San-gwang (이산광, 李山光) (1550 – 5 January 1624)
Sister-in-law: Lady Shin of the Geochang Shin clan (거창 신씨, 夫人 居昌 愼氏)
 Wive and children
 Lady Jo of the Yangju Jo clan (양주 조씨, 夫人 陽州 趙氏) (24 November 1542 – 19 April 1604); daughter of Jo Eon-su (조언수, 趙彦秀)
Son: Yi Gyeong-baek (이경백, 李慶伯; 1561–August 1580)
Daughter: Lady Yi (이씨, 夫人 李氏)
 Son-in-law: Yi Sang-hong (이상홍, 李尙弘)
Son: Yi Gyeong-jeon (이경전, 李慶全; 1567–1644)
 Daughter: Lady Yi (증 정경부인 이씨, 贈 貞敬夫人 李氏; d. 1592)
 Son-in-law: Yi Deok-hyeong (이덕형, 李德馨) of the Gwangju Yi clan (1561 - 1613)
 Grandson: Yi Yeo-gyu (이여규, 李如圭)
 Grandson: Yi Yeo-byeok (이여벽, 李如璧)
 Grandson: Yi Yeo-hwang (이여황, 李如璜)
 Granddaughter: Lady Yi of the Gwangju Yi clan (광주 이씨, 廣州 李氏)
 Grandson-in-law: Jeong Gi-sung (정기숭, 鄭基崇)
Daughter: Lady Yi (이씨, 夫人 李氏)
 Son-in-law: Yu Seong (유성, 柳惺)
Daughter: Lady Yi (이씨, 夫人 李氏)
 Son-in-law: Eung-hyeong (응형)
Son: Yi Gyeong-sin (이경신, 李慶伸)
Son: Yi Gyeong-yu (이경유, 李慶愈) died prematurely

Book 
 《Agye jip》(아계집, 鵝溪集) 
 《Agye yugo》(아계유고, 鵝溪遺稿)

Popular culture 
 Portrayed by Ahn Suk-hwan in the 2014 KBS2 TV series The King's Face.
 Portrayed by Lee Jae-yong in the 2015 KBS1 TV series The Jingbirok: A Memoir of Imjin War.

See also
Korean literature
List of Koreans
Joseon Dynasty
 Jeong Cheol

References

1539 births
1609 deaths
Korean male poets
16th-century Korean poets
Joseon scholar-officials
16th-century Korean painters
Korean scholars
Korean Confucianists
16th-century Korean philosophers